James Michael Kieran (August 23, 1863 – April 25, 1936) was president of Hunter College starting in 1929.

He was born on August 23, 1863 in New York City to Michael Kieran and Catherine Lynch. He married Kate Donahue in 1890 and they had seven children.

He became president of Hunter College on February 1, 1929, replacing George Samler Davis. He was formally installed in office on March 27, 1929. He retired in 1933.

He died on April 25, 1936.

Footnotes

External links
James Michael Kieran papers at Hunter College

1863 births
1936 deaths
Hunter College faculty